Nikhil Chittarasu (born 24 August 1990) is an Indian high jumper.

He finished eighth at the 2009 Asian Indoor Games, thirteenth at the 2010 Commonwealth Games, won the silver medal at the 2010 South Asian Games, competed at the 2010 Asian Games without reaching the final and finished ninth at the 2013 Asian Championships.

His personal best is 2.21 metres, achieved in May 2013 in Colombo.

References

1990 births
Living people
Indian male high jumpers
Athletes (track and field) at the 2010 Asian Games
Athletes (track and field) at the 2014 Asian Games
Commonwealth Games competitors for India
Athletes (track and field) at the 2010 Commonwealth Games
Place of birth missing (living people)
South Asian Games silver medalists for India
Asian Games competitors for India
South Asian Games medalists in athletics
21st-century Indian people